The Malaysian motorcycle Grand Prix is a round of the FIM Grand Prix motorcycle racing World Championship. The event is due to take place at the Sepang International Circuit until at least 2024.

History

The first Malaysian Grand Prix was held in 1991 at the Shah Alam Circuit as the final race of the season. Because of the long trip and high cost, many riders chose to not participate in this event. The 500cc race was won by John Kocinski. The event was notorious due to the tropical temperatures and a high degree of humidity, something which plagued the riders for four consecutive years – from 1992 to 1995 respectively.

In 1998, the race was moved from Shah Alam to the Johor Circuit. The reason for the change was because of the 1997 Asian financial crisis that hit Malaysia at this time. While the rich Sultan of Selangor protected the grand prix for years, the local government was no longer able to host the race at the venue. The circuit of Johor Bahru, close to the country of Singapore, was chosen and as a result, the circuit was overhauled: it was modernised and a new layer of asphalt was put on it. While there were pebbles on the track that kicked up and were a nuisance to the riders, the most shocking thing that happened during the weekend was when Lucio Cecchinello drove over the tail of a passing Cobra, which then looked up before getting hit at high speed by the leg of Gino Borsoi.

In 1999 the Sepang International Circuit, designed by Hermann Tilke, had finished construction. The circuit was not only more modern and purpose-built compared to Johor, it also lay close to Kuala Lumpur International Airport. As a result, the race for that season was moved to Sepang along with Formula One, who held its first race at the country in the same year. Since 1999, the Sepang circuit has hosted the Malaysian GP every year until 2020.

In 2006, the distance between the grid positions was increased following the 2006 Catalan motorcycle Grand Prix where multiple riders crashed on the first corner. On Saturday afternoon, the circuit was hit by a hefty thunderstorm: a lot of rain fell and as a result, the qualifying practice of the MotoGP and second practice of the 250cc classes were cancelled. This caused a problem because there was no official starting times. The problem was solved by combining the three best times set by all riders on Friday practice.

In 2010, Valentino Rossi won his first race in Malaysia since his accident at the Italian round earlier that year, which saw him break his leg. In 2011, Marco Simoncelli died on the first lap of the race after a horror accident where two riders hit him in the head and lower body. The race was abandoned shortly after.

In 2020, the Malaysian round was scrapped due to the COVID-19 pandemic.

Official names and sponsors

1991: Lucky Strike Malaysia Grand Prix
1992: Malaysia Motorcycle Grand Prix (no official sponsor)
1993: Malaysia Grand Prix
1994, 2001, 2012: Malaysian Grand Prix (no official sponsor)
1995–1996: Marlboro Grand Prix of Malaysia
1997–1999: Marlboro Malaysian Grand Prix
2000: Malaysian Motorcycle Grand Prix (no official sponsor)
2002: Gauloises Malaysian Motorcycle Grand Prix
2003–2006: Marlboro Malaysian Motorcycle Grand Prix
2007–2008: Polini Malaysian Motorcycle Grand Prix
2009–2011, 2013–2014: Shell Advance Malaysian Motorcycle Grand Prix
2015–2019: Shell Malaysia Motorcycle Grand Prix
2022–present: Petronas Malaysia Motorcycle Grand Prix

Formerly used circuits

Winners of the Malaysian motorcycle Grand Prix

Multiple winners (riders)

Multiple winners (manufacturers)

By year

Notes

References

 
Recurring sporting events established in 1991
1991 establishments in Malaysia